The 1983 Australian Open was a tennis tournament played on grass courts at the Kooyong Lawn Tennis Club in Melbourne in Victoria in Australia. It was the 72nd edition of the Australian Open and was held from 29 November through 11 December 1983.

Seniors

Men's singles

 Mats Wilander defeated  Ivan Lendl, 6–1, 6–4, 6–4
• It was Wilander's 2nd career Grand Slam singles title and his 1st title at the Australian Open.

Women's singles

 Martina Navratilova defeated  Kathy Jordan, 6–2, 7–6(7–5)
• It was Navratilova's 8th career Grand Slam singles title and her 2nd title at the Australian Open.

Men's doubles

 Mark Edmondson /  Paul McNamee defeated  Steve Denton /  Sherwood Stewart 6–3, 7–6 
 It was Edmondson's 4th career Grand Slam title and his 4th Australian Open title. It was McNamee's 4th and last career Grand Slam title and his 2nd Australian Open title.

Women's doubles

 Martina Navratilova /  Pam Shriver defeated  Anne Hobbs /  Wendy Turnbull 6–4, 6–7, 6–2
 It was Navratilova's 23rd career Grand Slam title and her 5th Australian Open title. It was Shriver's 6th career Grand Slam title and her 2nd Australian Open title.

Mixed doubles
The competition was not held between 1970 and 1986.

Juniors

Boys' singles
 Stefan Edberg defeated  Simon Youl 6–4, 6–4

Girls' singles
 Amanda Brown defeated  Bernadette Randall 7–6, 6–3

Boys' doubles
 Jamie Harty /  Des Tyson defeated  Darren Cahill /  Anthony Lane 3–6, 6–4, 6–3

Girls' doubles
 Bernadette Randall /  Kim Staunton defeated  Jenny Byrne /  Janine Thompson 3–6, 6–3, 6–3

Notes

External links
 Official website Australian Open

 
 

 
1983 in Australian tennis
November 1983 sports events in Australia
December 1983 sports events in Australia
1983,Australian Open